Jeff or Jeffrey White may refer to:

Jeff White (Australian footballer) (born 1977), Australian rules footballer 
Jeff White, founder of Operation Rescue (Kansas)
Jeffrey White (born 1945), District Judge serving on the United States District Court for the Northern District of California
Jeff White (visual effects), visual effects artist
Jeff White (musician) (born 1957), bluegrass guitarist/mandolinist, songwriter and record producer

See also
Geoffrey White (disambiguation)